Pirancheri is a village in the Udayarpalayam taluk of Ariyalur district, Tamil Nadu, India.

Demographics 

As per the 2001 census, Pirancheri had a total population of 1352 with 689 males and 663 females.

References 

Villages in Ariyalur district